Leleu is a French surname. Notable people with the surname include:

 Jean-François Leleu (1729–1807), French furniture-maker
 Jules Leleu, French furniture designer
 Philippe Leleu, French cyclist
 Leleu (footballer), Brazilian footballer

French-language surnames